Auerodendron is a genus of plant in family Rhamnaceae.

Species include:
 Auerodendron acuminatum (Griseb.) Urb.
 Auerodendron acunae Borhidi & O.Muñiz
 Auerodendron cubense (Britton & N.Wilson) Urb. 
 Auerodendron glaucescens Urb.
 Auerodendron jamaicense (Urb.) Urb.
 Auerodendron martii Alain
 Auerodendron northropianum Urb.
 Auerodendron pauciflorum Alain
 Auerodendron reticulatum (Griseb.) Urb.
 Auerodendron truncatum Urb.

References 

 
Rhamnaceae genera
Taxonomy articles created by Polbot